ASMFC may refer to:

 Atlantic States Marine Fisheries Commission, a commission in the United States.
 AS Monaco FC, a French soccer club.